HMS Maria was a schooner that the Americans captured in 1775 and that the British recaptured on 7 May 1776 at Quebec City and took into the Royal Navy.

Surprise and Martin sailed ahead to "annoy" the retreating American troops. On their way on 7 May they captured an American privateer schooner armed with four 6-pounder and six 3-pounder guns, and on 17 May they recovered . The privateer was Maria.

The British dismantled her and took her overland to Lake Champlain where they reassembled her.

 
Under the command of Lieutenant John Starke, Maria served on Lake Champlain in 1776 in the flotilla of Captain Thomas Pringle. She was at the battle of Valcour Island in 1776 where she served as the flagship for Colonel Guy Carleton, Lieutenant-Governor of the province of Quebec. Contrary winds prevented Maria from participating in the battle though.

Marias subsequent disposition is unknown as of November 2022.

Citations

References
 

1778 ships
Captured ships
Schooners of the Royal Navy